List of Australian films of 1991 contains a detailed list of films created in Australia in 1991

1991

See also 
 1991 in Australia
 1991 in Australian television

Notes

References

External links 
 Australian film at the Internet Movie Database

1991
Lists of 1991 films by country or language
Films